The men's freestyle 96 kilograms  at the 2004 Summer Olympics as part of the wrestling program were held at the Ano Liosia Olympic Hall, August 28 to August 29.

The competition held with an elimination system of three or four wrestlers in each pool, with the winners qualify for the quarterfinals, semifinals and final by way of direct elimination.

Future two division UFC champion Daniel Cormier competed in the tournament, finishing fourth.

Schedule
All times are Eastern European Summer Time (UTC+03:00)

Results 
Legend
F — Won by fall

Elimination pools

Pool 1

Pool 2

Pool 3

Pool 4

Pool 5

Pool 6

Pool 7

Knockout round

Final standing

References
Official Report

Men's Freestyle 96 kg
Men's events at the 2004 Summer Olympics